Simone Sello (born July 4, 1968) is an Italian born guitarist, music producer, composer, filmmaker and music journalist. He is known for his work with the Sanremo Festival Orchestra,Chicanery, Billy Sheehan, Aaron Carter, Disney, Hannah Montana, Vasco Rossi, Amber Lily, and Warren Cuccurullo, both as a producer and guitarist; and as a journalist for the magazines Chitarre, Strumenti Musicali, Accordo and Ganzo. He is an owner of music production companies RedRum Productions and MusicDemoProducer.com, with each company oriented towards a distinct clientele: RedRum Productions is geared towards contemporary music production for artists, film and TV and MusicDemoProducer.com aims to bring a simplified  approach to professional music production to any user, over the web.

His musical upbringing is based on classical violin studies, as well as watching and hearing his father play guitar, but he never took a formal guitar lesson, in spite of his career as a guitar player.
His influences include major classical and jazz composers and performers, (Bach, Ravel, Miles Davis, Weather Report), pop and rock acts (The Beatles, David Bowie, Pink Floyd, Metallica, Lucio Battisti), and experimental artists (Luciano Berio, Brian Eno, Terje Rypdal, Klaus Schulze).

Equally interested in performing, composing and producing music, Simone started getting hired to play guitar for recording sessions and live performances by artists in his hometown Rome when he was 17 years old, and eventually became known on a national level. While building a long list of musical collaborations, he started writing articles for magazines, thus achieving a different kind of exposure, still in the music field.

At the age of 29, he moved to Los Angeles to push his musician and journalist careers, by joining a big international scene.

Early professional career
After studying the violin, he started his professional career as a guitarist in Rome, recording a guitar solo on the song "Incinerator", soundtrack of the homonymous movie, produced in 1982 and never shown until 2020, then recording the song The Fighter with his band Waterfall, for the compilation Metal Attack (RCA 1987).
 Then, he got hired to play with Italian pop singers Renato Zero, Tullio De Piscopo, Nino Buonocore and Michele Zarrillo, and in several national TV shows.
From 1994 to 1997 he joined the orchestra of the Sanremo Festival, where he had a chance to play with several international musicians, such as Ray Charles, George Benson, Pat Metheny, Michael Bolton, Celine Dion, Kenny G, Nek, and Laura Pausini. During that time, he also arranged the song Non Ci Sto which brought the singer Syria to win the Sanremo singing contest in the "new artists" category, in 1996.

Music journalism
Meanwhile, he started writing articles on the music magazine Chitarre, based on analysis of rock, pop and jazz musicians. Then occasionally on Strumenti Musicali and – recently – on the web magazines Accordo and Ganzo. In Chitarre and Accordo, Simone Sello's articles have included interviews with, among other notable musicians, Steve Vai, Lee Ritenour, and Vasco Rossi.

Encouraged by the appeal his early articles had to young musicians, he published two instructional books and DVDs: Tecniche e segreti della chitarra elettrica dalla A alla Z (1996) and La chitarra rock – il fraseggio e l`improvvisazione (1997).

Move to Los Angeles
In 1997 he moved to Los Angeles, California, where he kept pursuing his musician and journalist careers. Through a referral by guitar legend Steve Vai, he met the bass player Billy Sheehan, with whom he started a long collaboration. After playing and programming Billy Sheehan's first two solo records (Compression in 2001 – which features Steve Vai and drummer Terry Bozzio – and Cosmic Troubadour in 2005) he produced Billy's third record, entitled Holy Cow (2009), which also includes guest appearances by Billy Gibbons, Paul Gilbert and Doug Pinnick.
Meanwhile, he had joined pop star Aaron Carter`s live band, with whom he appeared in several US TV shows, including The Tonight Show with Jay Leno and Donnie & Marie; he also appears in the live DVD Aaron`s Party (2002) along with Aaron`s brother Nick Carter, from Backstreet Boys. In 2014, he plays guitars in Cristina Scuccia's debut album (also known as Suor Cristina or Sister Christina), along with other LA musicians, such as Vinnie Colaiuta and Tim Pierce.

Disney
Through fellow producer Marco Marinangeli, he started a series of collaborations with Disney, including La Vida Mickey (2000), Disney Pop Dreamers (2002), Superstar Kidz Vol. 1 and 2 (2003–2004), Hannah Montana's Hits Remixed (2008), a series of Disney Mobile commercials for Japan featuring Hilary Duff, and a remix of the song Now Or Never from High School Musical 3.

Warren Cuccurullo and Chicanery
After meeting guitarist Warren Cuccurullo (formerly with Frank Zappa, Missing Persons and Duran Duran), he produced the debut CD of surreal alternative rock band Chicanery (dPulse 2010) at RedRum Studios.
In the album Simone Sello also plays bass, guitar, violin and synths; other remarkable musicians include vocalist Neil Carlill and guest drummer Terry Bozzio. . He also co-produced Warren's album Playing in Tongues (2009 Edel Records Europe – Zappa Records USA), and a concept album entitled N'Liten Up.

Vasco Rossi
In 2008 he started working with Italian rockstar Vasco Rossi, appearing in the videoclip for Il Mondo Che Vorrei (2008) and on the short documentary Quello che non si potrebbe (2008). He is listed as backing vocalist in the song Gioca Con Me, along with rock guitarist Slash. Then he collaborated to the CDTracks II – Inediti e rarità (2009), programming the hit song Sto Pensando A Te and playing lead guitar on Ho Fatto Un Sogno; in 2011, Vasco Rossi released a new studio album Vivere O Niente, which features Simone Sello on guitar, keyboards and programing on several tracks, and includes a song he co-wrote with Vasco and Saverio Principini, called Manifesto Futurista Della Nuova Umanità. In 2013 Vasco Rossi released two more singles: in the first one, called L'uomo più semplice Simone Sello is credited as guitarist, keyboardist and programmer, and in the second, called Cambia-menti he is credited as guitarist and co-writer. In Vasco's 2014 album Sono innocente, he appears again as a co-writer, in Lo Vedi, and as a guitar player, in L'Ape Regina and Marta Piange Ancora.
On January 1, 2021, Vasco Rossi released the single Una Canzone D’Amore Buttata Via, which features a guitar solo by Simone Sello.

Amber Lily
In 2011 Simone wrote and produced Coming To Life the debut CD of young American pop singer Amber Lily, whose song I`m Into It, got used in the movie Christmas Cupid (2010), and participated in Disney's Next Big Thing contest in 2010 with the songs "2 2 2 L 8 (too too too late)" and Next To You.

Scoring
In 2004 Simone wrote part of the soundtrack of the movie The Youngest Guns, and in 2005 he scored a short movie called 4 and 1/4 with Alex Alessandroni Jr.
With Saverio Principini, he co-scored the documentary Una su Tre (2011), and in 2012 he contributed to the soundtrack of the documentary Iceberg Slim: Portrait of a Pimp, directed by Jorge Hinojosa and produced by Ice-T.

Songwriting and production
As SimoneX, he had the song Lines of Change licensed in the movie Two Lovers (2008) and with Mafia Bianca Llc he had the song I Am Changing, co-written with Steven E. Heinstein, used in the movie When in Rome (2010 Touchstone Pictures) and its CD soundtrack. Another one of their songs I Know I am Broken made it into the episode Where`s Kaylie in the TV series Make It or Break It (2009).

Filmmaking
In 2018 Sello made the experimental movie Organum Mathematicum, consisting of original videos and images assembled over a continuum of 6 electronic musical pieces. The project won an award at the 9th monthly season of the Cult Critic Movie Awards  and achieved an honorable mention award at the May 2018 edition of the Festigious Film Festival.

Selected discography

Compilation
Album

Solo
Album

As producer, composer, writer, programmer, sound engineer, arranger, performer on other artists' albums

Filmography

Film
 The Youngest Guns (2004), theme music performed by Simone Sello – composer
 4 1/4 (2005 Posh Films), soundtrack score performed by Simone Sello and Alex Alessandroni, jr. – composer
 Vasco - Quello che non si potrebbe (2008 Wonderland Entertainment) cast member
 Two Lovers (2008 Magnolia Pictures) Lines of Change, performed by SimoneX – writer
 When in Rome (2010 Touchstone Pictures) I am Changing performed by Mafia Bianca, LLC – co-writer
 Una su Tre (2011 Cinerentola), soundtrack score performed by Simone Sello – composer
 Iceberg Slim: Portrait of a Pimp (2012 Ice-T), soundtrack score performed by Simone Sello – composer
 Organum Mathematicum (2018), directed by Simone Sello – director and composer

Television
 Sanremo Music Festival Rai 1 1994–1997 performer/arranger
 Make It or Break It ABC Family TV series 2009 Season 1, Episode 9 Where's Kaylie? I Know I'm Broken producer/writer
 Christmas Cupid TV movie 2010 I'm Into It writer

References

External links
 Red Rum Productions website
 MusicDemoProducer.com website
 Session Recording website

1968 births
Living people
Italian record producers
Pop guitarists
Italian rock guitarists
Italian male guitarists